Mosaic Reform Synagogue is a synagogue in Harrow, London, England. A member of the Movement for Reform Judaism, its rabbi is Kathleen de Magtige-Middleton.

The community was established as Middlesex New Synagogue in 1959 and has been based at its current location, 9 Bessborough Road, Harrow HA1 3BS, since 1962. Its current building, which was dedicated in 1977, is now shared with two other congregations – Mosaic Liberal (formerly Harrow & Wembley Progressive Synagogue) and Mosaic Masorti (Hatch End Masorti Synagogue).

See also
 List of Jewish communities in the United Kingdom
 List of former synagogues in the United Kingdom
 Movement for Reform Judaism

References

External links
 Official website
 Mosaic Reform Synagogue (formerly Middlesex New Synagogue) on Jewish Communities and Records – UK (hosted by JewishGen)

1959 establishments in England
20th-century synagogues
Buildings and structures in the London Borough of Harrow
Reform synagogues in the United Kingdom
Religion in the London Borough of Harrow
Jewish organizations established in 1959
Synagogues in London